The State College–DuBois, PA Combined Statistical Area (CSA) is made up of two counties in central Pennsylvania. The United States Office of Management and Budget recognized the State College and DuBois areas along with the counties of Centre and Clearfield, and Moshannon Valley Correctional Center as a combined statistical area (CSA) in Central Pennsylvania.

As of the 2010 United States census, the CSA had a population total of 235,632, ranking the ninth most populous in Pennsylvania and 123rd most populous in the United States.

Component metropolitan areas

State College, PA Metropolitan Statistical Area
 Centre County population 155,171

Cities/major boroughs
 Bellefonte
 Boalsburg
 Ferguson Township – home rule municipality
 Park Forest Village
 Philipsburg
 State College – home rule municipality

DuBois, PA Micropolitan Statistical Area
 Clearfield County population 81,642

Cities/major boroughs
 Clearfield
 Curwensville
 DuBois
 Treasure Lake

See also
 List of Metropolitan Statistical Areas
 List of Combined Statistical Areas

References

Metropolitan areas of Pennsylvania
Combined statistical areas of the United States